Ratu Paula Lacawai is a Fijian Chief and political leader.  From 2001 to 2006, he represented the Province of Serua in the Senate as one of fourteen nominees of the Great Council of Chiefs.

References

I-Taukei Fijian members of the Senate (Fiji)
Living people
Fijian chiefs
Politicians from Serua Province
Year of birth missing (living people)